Shallowford Bridge is a steel truss bridge built in 1918 that crosses the Toccoa River in north Georgia, United States. The bridge, located on Aska Road close to the city of Blue Ridge, is 175 feet in length, and 11 feet wide. The bridge is constructed from a steel truss frame with wooden deck to allow traffic to cross.  
The bridge forms part of the Benton MacKaye Trail.

References

Shallowford Bridge at Bridgehunter
Shallowford Bridge at Uglybridges.com

Road bridges in Georgia (U.S. state)
Bridges completed in 1918
Buildings and structures in Fannin County, Georgia
Steel bridges in the United States